Kovalchuk (Ukrainian and Russian: Ковальчук), Kavalchuk, Kowalczuk (Polish), Covalciuc (Moldovan/Romanian), also transliterated as Kowalchuk (in the North American diaspora), is a common East Slavic surname (one of the most popular in Ukraine). The Kovalchuk name extends back to before 1500 AD in Kievan Rus.

Koval (Коваль) literally translates as forge or blacksmith. The suffix -chuk denoted either a son of, or an apprentice to a blacksmith. It is somewhat similar in commonality to English surname Smith. It is also cognate with very popular Polish surnames Kowalczyk and Kowalski.

In East Slavic languages, the correct pronunciation is ko-vahl-CHOOK. Among Ukrainian Canadians, the pronunciation ko-WAL-chuk is more common.

People

Kovalchuk 
 Andrey Kovalchuk (born 1959), Russian sculptor
 Andriy Kovalchuk (born 1972), Ukrainian general
 Anna Kovalchuk (born 1977), Russian actress
 Boris Kovalchuk (born 1977), Russian official, son of Yury Kovalchuk
 Ekaterina Kovalchuk (born 1990), Belarusian footballer
 Ilya Kovalchuk (born 1983), Russian ice hockey player
 Kyrylo Kovalchuk (born 1986), Ukrainian footballer
 Mikhail Kovalchuk (born 1946), Russian physicist and politician
 Oleksii Kovalchuk (born 1989), Ukrainian poker player
 Olga Kovalchuk (born 1976), Ukrainian Paralympic sport shooter
 Petro Kovalchuk (born 1984), Ukrainian footballer
 Sergey Petrovich Kovalchuk (born 1973), Belarusian footballer
 Tatiana Kovalchuk (born 1979), Ukrainian tennis player
 Victoria Kovalchuk (1954–2021), Ukrainian artist
 Yury Kovalchuk (born 1951), Russian businessman and financier

Kavalchuk 
 Aksana Kavalchuk (born 1979), Belarusian volleyball player
 Maksim Kavalchuk (born 2000), Belarusian footballer
 Syarhey Kavalchuk (born 1978), Belarusian footballer

Kowalczuk 
 Aleksandra Kowalczuk (born 1996), Polish taekwondo practitioner
 Chris Kowalczuk (born 1985), Canadian football player
 Ilko-Sascha Kowalczuk (born 1967), German historian and author
 Jadwiga Kowalczuk (born 1931), Polish athlete

Other 
 Ed Kowalchuk (1926–2003), Canadian politician
 John Russell Kowalchuk (1921–2000), Canadian politician
 Serghei Covalciuc (born 1982), Moldovan-Ukrainian footballer

See also

References

Russian-language surnames
Ukrainian-language surnames